Cancer Investigation is a peer-reviewed medical journal in the field of basic and clinical oncology. The editor in chief is Gary Lyman. It is currently indexed for MEDLINE.

References 

Oncology journals
Publications established in 1983
10 times per year journals